This is a list of company towns in the United States.

Towns listed in bold are still considered company towns today; other entries are former company towns. See the :Category:Company towns in the United States for an unannotated list of articles.

Listed by state

Alabama 

 Acipco, Alabama, formerly owned by American Cast Iron Pipe Company
 Aldrich, Alabama, formerly owned by Montevallo Coal Mining Company
 Bayview, Alabama, formerly owned by Tennessee Coal, Iron and Railroad Co.
 Bemiston, Alabama, formerly owned by the Bemis Brothers Bag Company
 Chickasaw, Alabama, formerly owned by Gulf Shipbuilding Corporation
 Docena, Alabama, formerly owned by Tennessee Coal, Iron and Railroad Co.
 Edgewater, Alabama, formerly owned by Tennessee Coal, Iron and Railroad Co.
 Fairfield, Alabama, (1910) originally "Corey", formerly owned by Tennessee Coal, Iron and Railroad Co.
 Kaulton, Alabama, owned by Kaul Lumber Co.
 Margaret, Alabama established by Alabama Fuel and Iron Company
 West Blocton, Alabama, formerly owned by Cahaba Coal Mining Company
 Woodward, Alabama, formerly owned by Woodward Iron Company, later acquired by US Steel

Arizona 

 Ajo, Arizona, owned by Phelps Dodge
 Bagdad, Arizona, owned by Freeport McMoRan (formerly Phelps Dodge)
 Clarkdale, Arizona, built, named for, and formerly owned by Senator William A. Clark's United Verde Copper Company
 Kearny, Arizona, built by Kennecott Mining Company in 1958
 Morenci, Arizona, owned by Freeport McMoRan (formerly Phelps Dodge)
 San Manuel, Arizona, built for Magma Copper (later BHP)

California 

 Betteravia, California, built by Union Sugar Company
 Chester, California, associated with The Collins Companies
 Cowell, California, built by Cowell Portland Cement 
 Crannell, California, built by Little River Redwood Company
 Fort Bragg, California, is a decommissioned United States Army post with residential development and California Western Railroad service overseen by the Union Lumber Company
 Graeagle, California, owned by Fruit Growers Supply Company, an affiliate of Sunkist
 Hercules, California, built by the Hercules Powder Company
 Hilt, California, owned by Northern California Lumber Co., then purchased by the Fruit Growers Supply Company, an affiliate of Sunkist
 Irvine, California, built by The Irvine Company and incorporated in 1971; the largest planned community in the world, but technically not a company town.
Kirkwood, California, Owned by Vail Resorts
 Korbel, Humboldt County, California, built by Humboldt Lumber Mill Company 
 McCloud, California, built by McCloud River Railroad Lumber Company.
 Metropolitan, California, built by Metropolitan Redwood Lumber Company
 Nipton, California, owned by American Green llc
 Nortonville, California, owned by the Black Diamond Coal Mining Company
 Pino Grande, California, built by El Dorado Lumber Company
 Rockport, California, built by Cottoneva Lumber Company
 Samoa, California, built by Vance Lumber Company
 Scotia, California, largely owned by the Pacific Lumber Company (PALCO)
 Selby, California, owned by American Smelting and Refining Company. 
 Spreckels, California, formerly owned by Spreckels Sugar Company
 Tormey, California, owned by American Smelting and Refining Company. 
 Trona, California, formerly owned by American Potash and Chemical
 Usal, California, built by Usal Redwood Company
 Weed, California, named for sawmill owner Abner Weed
 Westwood, California, built by the Red River Lumber Company, sold in 1944 to Fruit Growers Supply Company, an affiliate of Sunkist
 Wheeler, California, built by lumber company

Colorado 

 Climax, Colorado, built by the Climax Molybdenum Company, The residential houses were all transported to the West Park subdivision of Leadville, Colorado, before 1965, leaving only the mining buildings standing.
 Durango, Colorado, organized in 1880 by the Denver and Rio Grande Railroad
 Gilman, Colorado, built around (and eventually abandoned due to) the New Jersey Zinc Company's Eagle mine
 Ludlow, Colorado, was dominated by Colorado Fuel and Iron
 Portland, Colorado, built by the Ideal Cement Company

Connecticut 

 Hazardville, Connecticut, industrial village centered around the Hazard Powder Company powder mill
 Collinsville, Connecticut, industrial village centered around the Collins Axe Company Manufacture of Machetes and Hand Axes

Florida 

 Lake Buena Vista, Bay Lake, and the Reedy Creek Improvement District located within Walt Disney World Resort, which is owned by The Walt Disney Company
 Ybor City, built by Vicente Martinez Ybor for his cigar manufacturing businesses; now one of Tampa's top night spots

Hawaii
Paia, Hawaii, developed by the Hawaiian Commercial & Sugar Co.
Puʻunene, Hawaii, developed by the Hawaiian Commercial & Sugar Co.

Idaho 

 Cobalt, Idaho, owned by the Howe Sound Mining Company (see Holden Village, Washington)
 Conda, Idaho (Anaconda Copper Mining Co.)
 Elk River, Idaho
 Headquarters, Idaho (Potlatch Lumber Company)
 Leadore, Idaho
 Potlatch, Idaho (Potlatch Lumber Company)

Illinois 

 Granite City, Illinois, built by St. Louis Stamping Company, a steel company known for its "Granite ware" in which cooking utensils were made to look like granite
 Hegewisch, Chicago, founded by Adolph Hegewisch (President of the United States Rolling Stock Company) to emulate the company town of Pullman.
 Pullman, Chicago, once an independent city within Illinois, owned by the Pullman Sleeping Car Co.
 Naplate, built and formerly owned by the National Plate Glass Co.
 Steger, Illinois, built and formerly owned by Steger and Sons Piano.

Indiana 

 Gary, Indiana, built and formerly owned by U.S. Steel
 Marktown, built for the Mark Manufacturing Company in East Chicago
 Sunnyside, built and formerly owned by Inland Steel in East Chicago

Iowa 

 Buxton, a camp of the Consolidation Coal Company, abandoned.
 Cleveland, a camp of the Whitebreast Coal and Mining Company, outside Lucas, abandoned.
 Everist, a camp of the Mammoth Vein Coal Company (later, the Empire Coal Company), abandoned.
 Muchakinock, a coal camp of the Consolidation Coal Company, abandoned.
 Newton, where the well-known Maytag company closed down in 2006.
 Numa and its abandoned suburb Martinstown, former home of the Numa Block Coal Company.
 Severs, south of Colfax camp of the Colfax Consolidated Coal Company, abandoned.
 Stone City, a town built by local limestone quarry businesses. Today an unincorporated community.

Kentucky 

 Barthell, built by the Stearns Coal and Lumber Company in 1902.
 Benham, built and formerly owned by International Harvester.
 Blackey, built and formerly owned by Blackey Coal Company.
 Blue Heron, ghost town built by Stearns Coal and Lumber Company.
 David, built and formerly owned by Princess Elkhorn Coal Company.
 Fleming-Neon, built and formerly owned by Elkhorn Coal Corporation.
 Highsplint, built and formerly owned by High Splint Coal Company.
 Jenkins, built and formerly owned by Consolidation Coal Company.
 Lynch, built and formerly owned by U.S. Steel.
 Midway, built and laid out by Lexington and Ohio Railroad in 1830.
 Seco, built and formerly owned by South Eastern Coal Company.
 Stearns, built by Stearns Coal and Lumber Company.
 Stone, built and formerly owned by Pond Creek Coal Company. It was also owned by Fordson Coal Company and Eastern Coal Company.
 Thealka, built and formerly owned by North East Coal Company.
 Van Lear, built and formerly owned by Consolidation Coal Company.
 Wayland, built and formerly owned by Elk Horn Coal Company.
 Wheelwright, built and formerly owned by Elk Horn Coal Company.

Louisiana 

 Bogalusa, Louisiana, started by Great Southern Lumber Company
 Elizabeth, Louisiana started by Industrial Lumber Company
 Fisher, Louisiana, started by Louisiana Long Leaf Lumber Company
 Garden City, Louisiana, started by Albert Hanson Lumber Company
 Glenmora, Louisiana started by Louisiana Sawmill Company Ltd. 
 Kinder, Louisiana started by Peavy Byrnes Lumber Company
 Long Leaf, Louisiana started by Crowell and Spencer Lumber Company
 Pawnee, Louisiana

Maine 

 Chisholm, Maine, built by the Otis Falls Pulp & Paper Company
 Hastings, Maine, built by the Hastings Lumber Company
 Katahdin Iron Works, built by Piscataquis Iron Works Company
 Millinocket, Maine, 20th century residential development for the Great Northern Paper Company mill
 Milo, Maine, includes residential developments for employees of Bangor and Aroostook Railroad's Derby shops
 Newhall, Maine, residences for employees of Oriental Powder Company
 Rumford, Maine, includes residential developments by paper mill owner Hugh J. Chisholm
 Westbrook, Maine, 20th century economy dominated by S. D. Warren Paper Mill

Massachusetts 

 Hopedale, Massachusetts, former home of the Draper Corporation, textile machine manufacturer.
 North Dighton, Massachusetts, former textile mill town, greatly expanded during the 1910s–1920s.
 Southbridge, Massachusetts, former mill town, known for the home of American Optical Company.
 Whitinsville, Massachusetts, former home of Whitin Machine Works, textile machine manufacturer.

Michigan 

 Alberta, Michigan, started by Henry Ford
 Gwinn, Michigan, owned by Cleveland Cliffs Iron, nicknamed the "Model Town", because CCI intended its layout to be a model for all of their other company towns
 Hermansville, Michigan, started by the Wisconsin Land & Lumber Company

Minnesota 

 Akeley, Minnesota, developed by T. B. Walker and named for his business partner, Healy C. Akeley
 Babbitt, Minnesota, developed by Reserve Mining Co.
 Elcor, Minnesota, developed by Pickands Mather & Company
 Hoyt Lakes, Minnesota, developed by Erie Mining Co.
 Morgan Park, Duluth, Minnesota, built by U.S. Steel and named for J.P. Morgan
 Splitrock, Minnesota, developed by the Split Rock Lumber Company

Mississippi 

 Bankston, Mississippi, ghost town, former location of Bankston Textile Mill
 Electric Mills, Mississippi, started by Sumter Lumber Company
 Fernwood, Mississippi, started by Fernwood Lumber Company

Missouri 
Deering, Missouri, established by Deering Harvester Company or its successor International Harvester Company and later acquired by Wisconsin Lumber Company, which eventually ceased operations and divested it
Grandin, Missouri, established by Missouri Lumber and Mining Company
Leadwood, Missouri, developed by St. Joe Lead
Trenton, Missouri, Ruskin College acquired all the businesses in the hopes of building a utopian society

Montana 

 Colstrip, Montana, a coal strip mining town formerly owned by Montana Power Company
 Trident, Montana, a former Portland cement company town owned by Holcim

Nevada 

 Boulder City, Nevada, built and formerly owned by the United States Bureau of Reclamation
 Empire, Nevada, owned by USG Corporation

New Hampshire 

 Berlin, New Hampshire, residential development for wood products manufacturing by Berlin Mills Company
 Harrisville, New Hampshire, historic textile mill village; National Historic Landmark

New Jersey 
 Haskell, New Jersey, named for Laflin & Rand company president Jonathan Haskell
 Manville, New Jersey, the largest tract of land was the Johns Manville Corporation 
 Maurer, Perth Amboy built by brick manufacturer after the Civil War and later absorbed into Perth Amboy
 Roebling, New Jersey, a factory village within the limits of Florence, New Jersey; the town was owned by the Roebling Steel Corporation run by the descendants of John A. Roebling

New Mexico 

 Madrid, New Mexico, residential development for miners of the Albuquerque and Cerrillos Coal Company
 Playas, New Mexico, built by Phelps Dodge Corporation

New York 

 Cohoes, New York, formerly owned by Harmony Mills
 Endicott, New York planned and incorporated by Endicott Johnson Corporation
 Johnson City, New York renamed by and after George F. Johnson of the Endicott Johnson Corporation
 Oneida, New York, incorporated 1848 by the Oneida Community which later became Oneida Limited
 Steinway Village, the part of New York City in Astoria, Queens used by employees of Steinway & Sons

North Carolina 
 Bunn, North Carolina, a former company town previously owned by the Montgomery Lumber Company
 Bynum, North Carolina, formerly owned by J.M. Odell Manufacturing Company (town purchased by the county in the 1970s)
 Canton, North Carolina, a company town built-up by the Champion International Paper Company
 Kannapolis, North Carolina, owned by the Cannon Mills Company
 Saxapahaw, North Carolina, formerly owned by Sellers Manufacturing Company

Ohio 

 Glenwillow, Ohio, built by the Austin Powder Company
 Goes Station, Ohio, built by the Miami Powder Company
 Kings Mills, Ohio, built by the Great Western Powder Company and Peters Cartridge Company
 McDonald, Ohio, built and formerly owned by the Carnegie Steel Company (later U.S. Steel)
 Rossford, Ohio, founded by the Edward Ford Plate Glass Company (later Libbey-Owens-Ford)

Oklahoma 

 Broken Bow, Oklahoma
 Wright City, Oklahoma, built by the Choctaw Lumber Company

Oregon 
 Algoma, Oregon, supported by the Algoma Lumber Company
 Bradwood, Oregon
 Brookings, Oregon, built by John E. Brookings and sold to California & Oregon Lumber Company
 Dee, Oregon
 Gilchrist, Oregon
 Grand Ronde, Oregon
 Hines, Oregon
 Kinzua, Oregon
 Maxville, Oregon
 Mowich, Oregon
 Neverstill, Oregon
 Olney, Oregon
 Orenco, Oregon, Oregon Nursery Company
 Perry, Oregon
 Pine Ridge, Oregon
 Pondosa, Oregon
 Powers, Oregon
 Shevlin, Oregon
 Southport, Oregon, owned by the Black Diamond Coal Mining Company
 Starkey, Oregon
 Valsetz, Oregon
 Vanport, Oregon
 Vaughn, Oregon
 Wauna, Oregon
 Wendling, Oregon
 Westfir, Oregon
 Wheeler, Tillamook County, Oregon
 Wilark, Oregon

Pennsylvania 
 Aliquippa, Pennsylvania, former home of the Jones & Laughlin Steel Company
 Ambridge, Pennsylvania, formed in 1905 by the American Bridge Company
 Braddock, Pennsylvania, dominated by Carnegie Steel Company and later by U.S. Steel 
 Buck Run, Pennsylvania, built by James B. Neale between 1902 and 1943 for his anthracite coal miners and their families. By 1925, his company town boasted of a school, an infirmary, a community recreation facility, a company store and several churches in addition to homes for the miners with running water, electricity and steam heat. The Buck Run colliery was located outside of Pottsville, in Schuylkill County. 
 Ford City, Pennsylvania, organized in 1887 by PPG Industries
 Hershey, Pennsylvania, built by Hershey Chocolate Corporation 
 Kistler, Pennsylvania, built by the Mount Union Refractories Company in 1918, designed by John Nolen
 Lake Trade, Pennsylvania, a now defunct coal mining town in Venango Township, Northern Butler County
 Lawrence Park Township, Pennsylvania, built by General Electric Company in 1919
 Natrona, Pennsylvania, built by the Pennsylvania Salt Manufacturing Company in the 1850s with later additions
 Peale, Pennsylvania (1883–1912)
 Saxonburg, Pennsylvania, founded by John A. Roebling and other German immigrants it was the site of his first wire works in the United States (see also Roebling, New Jersey)
 Claghorn, Vintondale, and Wehrum, Pennsylvania, built by the Lackawanna Coal Company
 Tacony, Philadelphia, built by Henry Disston for workers at his saw factory
 Wilmerding, Pennsylvania, a borough formed by the Westinghouse Air Brake Company
 Vandergrift, Pennsylvania, established by George McCurtry, President of Apollo Iron and Steel Company
 Woolrich, Pennsylvania, the home of Woolrich, Inc.

Rhode Island 

 Slatersville, Rhode Island, historic former mill village

South Carolina 

 Newry, South Carolina
 Piedmont, South Carolina

South Dakota 

 East Sioux Falls, South Dakota, an old quarrying town east of Sioux Falls, owned by the East Sioux Falls Quarry Company.

Tennessee 

 Alcoa, Tennessee, formerly owned by Alcoa and still economically dominated by the company
 Bemis, Tennessee, built by the Bemis Bag Company for mill workers; now a history district in Jackson
 Coalmont, Tennessee, operated by the Sewanee Coal, Coke and Land Company  
 Norris, Tennessee, built and formerly owned by the Tennessee Valley Authority
 Oak Ridge, Tennessee, built in secret by the United States government for the Manhattan Project; controlled by the federal government until 1959
 Old Hickory, Tennessee, built to house DuPont employees; now a suburb of Nashville

Texas 

 Camden, Texas, owned by the W.T. Carter & Brother Lumber Company and its successors
 Sugar Land, Texas, once owned and run by the Imperial Sugar Company, transformed into an upscale suburb of Houston
 Thurber, Texas, owned by a coal-mining subsidiary of the Texas and Pacific Railway. It was the site of a large brick factory, using the mine's low grade coal

Utah 
 Bacchus, Utah, Hercules Powder Company, now a ghost town
 Bingham Canyon, Utah
 Bryce Canyon City, Utah, built and owned by Ruby's Inn and the Syrett family, owners of Ruby's Inn

Vermont 

 Proctor, Vermont, once owned by the Vermont Marble Company; the town of Proctor was under the control of Senator Redfield Proctor

Virginia 

 Bacova, Virginia, created by the Tidewater Lumber Company. The name Bacova was selected by the company as shorthand for Bath County, Va.
 Saltville, Virginia, dominated by Mathieson Alkali Works and its successors through the Olin Corporation
 Stanleytown, Virginia was dominated by Stanley Furniture

Washington 

 Alpine, Washington, owned by Alpine Lumber Company
 Barneton, Washington, owned by Kent Lumber Company, bought in 1911 by Seattle City Light, razed in 1924
 Black Diamond, Washington, owned by the Black Diamond Coal Mining Company, sold to the Pacific Coast Company in 1904
 Bodie, Washington, and its related Bodie Mine controlled by the Northern Gold Company
 Coulee Dam, Washington was originally two adjacent company towns created in 1933 to support the construction of Grand Coulee Dam – Mason City, owned by lead construction contractor Consolidated Builders Inc., and Engineers' Town, owned by the U.S. Bureau of Reclamation. CBI transferred control of Mason City to Reclamation in 1942. Reclamation then combined Engineers' Town and Mason City into Coulee Dam in 1948, began selling the town to its inhabitants in 1957, and completed the divestiture in 1959, when Coulee Dam officially incorporated as a town.
 Diablo, Washington is a running settlement in unincorporated Whatcom County, it was created by Seattle City Light in 1930
 Dupont, Washington, provided housing to workers at a dynamite factory on the waterfront operated by E. I. du Pont de Nemours and Company. 
 Holden, Washington, built by the Howe Sound Mining Company, which also owned Britannia Beach; once the most productive copper mine in the U.S., the mine closed in 1957 and it and the townsite were sold to a unit of the Lutheran church for $1 in the 1950s; now run as a Christian retreat center
 Hooper, Washington, owned by the McGregor Land and Livestock Company
 Longview, Washington, established in 1921 by the Long-Bell Lumber Company and led by Robert A. Long the lumber baron from Kansas.
 Newhalem, Washington, owned by Seattle City Light, as is nearby Diablo
 Port Gamble, Washington, still owned by Pope & Talbot but the lumber mill has not operated since the mid-1990s
 Roche Harbor, Washington, formerly supporting lime kilns owned by Tacoma and Roche Harbor Lime Company
 Ruston, Washington, established by industrialist William Rust; the town's primary industry was an ASARCO copper smelting plant
 Snoqualmie Falls, Washington, established by Weyerhaeuser. It was abandoned on an unknown date.

West Virginia 

 Cass, West Virginia, founded in 1901 for West Virginia Pulp and Paper Company logging the nearby mountains
 Coalwood, West Virginia, formerly owned by the Olga Coal Company
 Gary, West Virginia, formerly owned by U.S. Steel
 Grant Town, West Virginia, built by the Federal Coal and Coke Company, which built and operated the Federal No. 1 Mine.
Kay Moor or Kaymoor, West Virginia, owned by the Low Moor Iron Company

Wisconsin 

 Fosterville, Wisconsin,  was built by John J. Foster of the Vilas County Lumber Company.  Now it is named Presque Isle, Wisconsin
 Goodman, Wisconsin, built by Goodman Lumber Co.
 Kohler, Wisconsin, built by the Kohler Company
 Laona, Wisconsin, built by the William D. Connor's  Connor Company
 Winegar, Wisconsin, Fosterville renamed by William S. Winegar of the Vilas County Lumber Company in 1910. Now named Presque Isle, Wisconsin

Wyoming 

 Bairoil, Wyoming became a company town supported by Amoco
 Jeffrey City, Wyoming was built in 1957 to house employees of nearby Western Nuclear uranium mining and milling operations. Other uranium mining companies built housing adjacent to the town to take advantage of its location and infrastructure. The townsite was sold off in an auction in the 1990s.
 Gas Hills, Wyoming was composed of several mining companies' towns, the largest of which was owned by Lucky Mc Uranium.
 Shirley Basin, Wyoming was another uranium mining company town owned by Utah Construction and Mining's uranium operations.
 Table Rock, Wyoming was built in the 1970s to support the nearby Colorado Interstate Gas processing plant.
 Wright, Wyoming was built by ARCO in the 1970s to support its Black Thunder Coal Mine. Wright incorporated in 1985

References

Further reading
 
 

 
Company towns
United States
Company